José María Leandro Gómez Calvo, better known as Leandro Gómez (Montevideo, 13 March 1811 – Paysandú, 2 January 1865) was a Uruguayan military officer and politician. A member of the National Party, he is best remembered for his heroical defense during the Siege of Paysandú in 1864.

The Route 26 is named after him.

References

Bibliography
 
 
 

1811 births
1865 deaths
Uruguayan generals
National Party (Uruguay) politicians
Burials in Paysandú Department

Uruguayan people of Galician descent